Johanna Stockschläder (born 11 February 1995) is a German handballer who plays for Neckarsulmer SU in the Handball-Bundesliga Frauen and the Germany women's national team.

She made her debut on the Germany national team on 17 April 2021, against Portugal.

Achievements
Handball-Bundesliga Frauen:
Winner: 2021

References

1995 births
Living people
Sportspeople from Siegen
German female handball players
Expatriate handball players
21st-century German women